Craig Thompson (born January 24, 1986 in Littleton, Colorado) is an American soccer player who currently plays for Real Colorado Foxes in the USL Premier Development League.

Career

College
Thompson attended Highlands Ranch High School, and played four years of college soccer at the Colorado School of Mines.

Professional
He was drafted in the second round with the 28th overall selection of the 2008 MLS Supplemental Draft by Houston Dynamo, but was waived by Dynamo before playing a senior game, and was eventually picked up by D.C. United on June 30. He made his full professional debut on July 1, 2008, as a second-half substitute in a 2008 Lamar Hunt U.S. Open Cup third-round game against Rochester Rhinos. He subsequently played in the 2008 North American SuperLiga, starting his team's first two games against Chivas Guadalajara and Atlante F.C., and made six MLS appearances before being waived at the end of the 2008 season.

Having been unable to secure a professional contract elsewhere, Thompson signed with the Real Colorado Foxes of the USL Premier Development League in 2009.

Honors

D.C. United
Lamar Hunt U.S. Open Cup (1): 2008

References

1986 births
Living people
American soccer players
Houston Dynamo FC players
D.C. United players
Real Colorado Foxes players
Colorado Mines Orediggers men's soccer players
Major League Soccer players
USL League Two players
Houston Dynamo FC draft picks
Soccer players from Colorado
Association football midfielders